Korei (also Romanized as Korei; also known as Chār Rāh, Katra, Katreh, Koreh, korehi and Korreh) is a city and capital of Sarchehan District, in Sarchahan County, Fars Province, Iran.  At the 2006 census, its population was 3,158, in 807 families.

References

Populated places in Sarchehan County
Cities in Fars Province